Steven Universe is an American animated television series created by Rebecca Sugar for Cartoon Network. The series revolves around Steven Universe (voiced by Zach Callison), who protects his hometown of Beach City alongside Garnet (voiced by Estelle), Amethyst (voiced by Michaela Dietz) and Pearl (voiced by Deedee Magno Hall), three magical alien guardians known as the Crystal Gems. During the original run of the series, episodes of Steven Universe were variously broadcast once a week; in blocks of multiple new episodes in the course of a week, marketed as "Stevenbombs"; or back-to-back as specials with an umbrella title.

 A television film, Steven Universe: The Movie, was released on September 2, 2019, following the fifth and final season. A concluding limited series, Steven Universe Future, premiered on December 7, 2019, and ended on March 27, 2020.

Series overview

Episodes
The order and length of the first three seasons is inconsistent between official sources; this list uses the "intended order" of the episodes as specified by co–executive producer Ian Jones-Quartey, which re-orders six episodes from the first two seasons compared to the broadcast order.

Pilot (2013)

Season 1 (2013–15)
26 half-hours (52 episodes) were produced for Season 1; this list includes a 53rd, "Say Uncle," which was produced and aired as part of Season 2, but which in terms of story chronology is placed by Jones-Quartey's list late in Season 1.

Episode premieres initially occurred weekly on Monday nights, but moved to Wednesday nights beginning with the episode "Steven the Sword Fighter," then to Thursday nights beginning with the episode "Coach Steven". The episodes "Open Book", "Shirt Club", and "Story for Steven" were bumped to air during the second season in order to facilitate airing the final 'arc' of season one over five consecutive nights.

Every episode was supervised directed by Ian Jones-Quartey, but uncredited for "Say Uncle".

Season 2 (2015–16)
Season 2 and Season 3 were produced as one season of 26 half-hours, comprising 49 regular episodes, 1 double-length special, and 6 shorts. When the season was officially split in two after the fact, 26 of the regular episodes and the shorts were aired as "Season 2". This included "Say Uncle," but as previously noted, this list moves that episode to Season 1.

Jasmin Lai is the art director for every episode, with Elle Michalka co-directing "Full Disclosure".

Season 3 (2016)
 Season 3 consists of the remaining 23 regular episodes and 1 double-sized episode produced alongside season 2. 
 The episodes "Super Watermelon Island", "Gem Drill", "Same Old World", "Barn Mates", and "Hit the Diamond" aired as a four-week special event titled In Too Deep.
 The remaining episodes of the season all aired during another four-week special event titled Summer Adventures.

Season 4 (2016–17)
 Season 4 was initially ordered together with Season 5, as a set of 26 half-hours, but the two were split into separate seasons during production. Season 4 consists of 13 half-hours (23 regular episodes, 1 double-length special, and 5 shorts).
 The episodes "Kindergarten Kid" and "Know Your Fusion" were the last two episodes to air during a four-week special event titled Summer Adventures.
 "Steven's Dream", "Adventures in Light Distortion", "Gem Heist", "The Zoo", and  "That Will Be All" aired as a four-night special event titled Out of This World.
 Episode premieres moved to Fridays beginning with the episode "The New Crystal Gems".

Season 5 (2017–19)
 Season 5 consists of the remaining 13 half-hours ordered alongside Season 4, plus 3 additional half-hours ordered after it was decided to bring the series to an end, to conclude the story. Together, they comprise 26 regular episodes, 1 double-length special, and 1 quadruple-length finale. 
 The episodes "Stuck Together", "The Trial", "Off Colors", and "Lars' Head" aired together as a one-hour special, under the umbrella title Wanted.
 The episodes "Lars of the Stars" and "Jungle Moon" aired together as a half-hour special, under the umbrella title Stranded. 
 Episode premieres moved to Monday nights beginning with the episode "Your Mother and Mine".
 The episodes "Now We're Only Falling Apart", "What's Your Problem", "The Question", "Made of Honor", and "Reunited" aired as a five-night special event titled Heart of the Crystal Gems. 
 The episodes "Legs from Here to Homeworld", "Familiar", "Together Alone", "Escapism", and "Change Your Mind" aired as a five-week special event titled Diamond Days.
 Each episode was art directed by Liz Artinian.

Film (2019)

A television film based on the series, titled Steven Universe: The Movie, premiered on Cartoon Network on September 2, 2019; its production was first announced on July 21, 2018, at San Diego Comic-Con with the release of its first teaser trailer. The film is a musical, featuring musical collaborations with Chance the Rapper, Estelle, Gallant, Aimee Mann, James Fauntleroy, Macie Stewart, Mike Krol, and others, and takes place two years after the events of "Change Your Mind".

Steven Universe Future (2019–20)

A limited series, Steven Universe Future, intended to serve as an epilogue to the main series, premiered on December 7, 2019.

Shorts

Season 2 (2015)
All six digital shorts combined make up one full production code of the second season (1031-058).

Season 4 (2016)
All five of these shorts combined make up one full production code of the fourth season (1040-112).

Dove Self-Esteem Project shorts (2018–19)
These shorts are written solely by Rebecca Sugar and are animated by Chromosphere Studio.

The Crystal Gems Say Be Anti-Racist shorts (2020–21)
A series of public service announcement shorts where the Crystal Gems teach the audience about anti-racism. All of the shorts are written by Rebecca Sugar and Ian Jones-Quartey, and animated by Chromosphere Studio.

Home media
Depending on the customer's region, Steven Universe is available through various video on demand services such as Hulu, Google Play, iTunes, Amazon Video, and Microsoft Movies & TV.

In North America, Warner Home Video has Steven Universe on DVD in several formats: single-disc compilations of select episodes, two Complete Season releases, and a Complete Collection box set. The Complete Collection, which was originally scheduled for November 3, 2020, and subsequentially delayed until December 8, contains all 160 episodes of the original Steven Universe series, Steven Universe: The Movie, and all 20 episodes of Steven Universe Future; the bonus material from the Complete Season DVDs and The Movie was included alongside new content.

Madman Entertainment followed a similar pattern in Australia. They released two compilation DVDs, five Complete Season DVD/Blu-ray releases, and a standalone DVD of The Movie. Madman's season releases use an alternative episode order and lack the bonus material included in the North American versions.

In the United Kingdom, Manga Entertainment released the first season on DVD and Blu-ray on February 24, 2020. This version used Madman's episode order but included the bonus material from the American DVD. The second season was planned to be released on March 16, 2020, but was cancelled before release.

Several episodes are re-ordered on home video. In the table below, the episodes are listed in the order they appear on the disc, and are numbered according to the episode tables above.

Region 1

Region 2

Region 4

Notes

References

 Production code columns
 Production codes are stamped on numerous model sheets and storyboards that must be searched for, in:  http://www.cartoonnetwork.com/shows/steven-universe/pictures/index.html

2010s television-related lists
Lists of Cartoon Network television series episodes
Lists of American children's animated television series episodes